Malva punctata (syn. Lavatera punctata), commonly called spotted-stalked tree-mallow or annual tree mallow, is an annual herbaceous plant belonging to the genus Malva of the family Malvaceae.

Description
Malva punctata reaches on average  of height. The stem is erect and covered with scattered hairs. The leaves are alternate, trilobed with the central lobe larger than the others, petiolate with stipules, the lowest are kidney-shaped and slightly lobed, while the upper ones are pentagonal. The flowers grow in the axils of the leaves. The flowering period extends from May through June.

Gallery

Distribution
Plant of  western Mediterranean origin is distributed from the South of France and  Italy to Albania, Greece, Palestine, Israel, Asia Minor and Turkey.

Habitat
They prefer rocky soils in sunny areas and fallow fields, hedgerows, beds of streams and road margins.

References

 Pignatti S. - Flora d'Italia - Edagricole – 1982 – Vol. II, pg. 89
Lavatera punctata

punctata
Flora of Lebanon